Lakehill Airport , is a privately owned airport near Mars, Pennsylvania, U.S., part of the Pittsburgh metropolitan area.  It is the smallest of the three airports located in Butler County.  The other two are the Butler County Airport, and the Butler Farm Show Airport.

References

External links 

Airports in Pennsylvania
Transportation buildings and structures in Butler County, Pennsylvania
Privately owned airports